Atlantic 252 was an Irish longwave radio station broadcasting across Ireland and Great Britain on 252 kHz (1190 metres) from its 1988 purpose-built transmission site at Clarkstown radio transmitter, County Meath, which provided service to Atlantic 252 from 1989 until 2002. The station's studios were located 12 km (7 mi) away in Mornington House, Summerhill Road, Trim, County Meath. Atlantic 252 also had sales offices and studios at 74, Newman Street in London.

After its closure, the station's former frequency and transmitter were used for the failed TEAMtalk 252 project which lasted for just a few months in 2002. From 2004, the frequency was used by RTÉ to provide a version of RTÉ Radio 1 to the expatriate community in Britain from the Clarkstown radio transmitter. Since 2014 there have been several announcements of the impending closure of this transmitter but as of 2019 it remains on air albeit on significantly reduced power.

Early history
The concept of Atlantic 252 can be traced to as far back as August 1986, when Irish state broadcaster RTÉ announced it was to use its allocated longwave frequency for a new pop music station. RTÉ teamed up with RTL Group / Radio Luxembourg to form Radio Tara – the trading name of Atlantic 252 – which, being on longwave, was able to provide reception across Ireland and the United Kingdom. This followed Chris Cary's test transmissions from Rathfarnham, County Dublin, in the mid-1980s, transmitting on 254 kHz longwave as pirate station Radio Exidy.

In 1987 RTÉ commenced building a giant 3-sided 248-metre broadcast mast in Clarkstown, County Meath, using a specially built pair of air- and water-cooled 300 kW solid-state transmitters (which could be combined to give double power) built by Varian Associates, Texas, despite protests from local residents. Studios were set up in Mornington House, in the nearby town of Trim. The station cost £6 million to set up. Just over 47 million people were in the station's broadcast area.

At 8.00 local time (7.00 GMT) on the morning of 1 September 1989 Gary King announced on Atlantic 252, "Mine is the first voice you will ever hear on Atlantic 252." This was followed by a specially produced pre-recorded introduction tape that introduced everybody employed by the radio station on its launch day, from engineers, administration, management like Travis Baxter and John Catlett, and the station's personality music presenter line-up including ex-Laser 558 presenter Charlie Wolf, Henry Owens, Mary Ellen O'Brien, Dusty Rhodes, Al Dunne, Tony West, Jeff Graham and the station's newsreader Andrew Turner. An appearance was even made by Rosalyn Reilly – who was to remain the station's cleaning lady for its entire twelve-year history.

The station's official "first record ever played" – on the launch date of 1 September 1989 – was "Sowing the Seeds of Love" by Tears for Fears, followed by "Monkey" by George Michael. The first record played during the period of Atlantic 252's test transmissions had been "Ain't Nobody" by Rufus and Chaka Khan ('89 Remix).

Although the transmitter was in the Republic of Ireland, the signal's reach meant that it was often looked upon as a "UK national station". Reception reports were received from such locations as Berlin, Finland, Ibiza, and Moscow. The signal had even been received in Brazil at night-time. The Scottish musician Mylo has claimed that it was the only station with listenable reception on the Isle of Skye. At launch there were no UK-wide commercial stations (the first would be Classic FM in 1992), and the lack of a UK broadcast licence attracted the attention of the IBA. Although the transmitters were theoretically capable of being combined to operate at a radiated power of 600 kW, international agreements limited it to a daytime maximum 500 kW, and just 100 kW during the hours of darkness.

Mid-1990s peak
Initially, the station transmitted only from 6a.m. until 7p.m., outside of which listeners were invited to tune to Radio Luxembourg. In August 1990 the station extended its broadcasting hours to 2a.m., and in September 1991 Atlantic 252 began broadcasting a 24-hour service although the overnight programming was automated and was branded as "The Big Mattress". The music format consisted of high-rotation mainstream pop and rock music, with influences borrowed heavily from American radio, and through to 1993, the station was known to play much of the music mostly from the top part of the US charts. The station mixed the best songs from the last few years along with the best songs from the top 40 – this was called "Today's Best Music Variety". Commercial Radio and the BBC initially objected to the station, seeing it as a commercial pirate. However, as UK commercial radio developed and deregulation saw many more stations launching, formats similar to Atlantic's began to appear on FM and Atlantic 252's audience began to decline. Attempts at repositioning followed, including "Real Music, Real Radio", when the station attempted to tackle BBC Radio 1's "new music" format. At the peak of its popularity in 1993, Atlantic 252 had 6 million listeners aged 15+ in the UK and Ireland, but vastly increased competition from local radio stations with similar formats saw this decline yearly.

Relaunch attempts
In late 1998 under the direction of David Dunne the station responded to dropping audiences by shifting its format to concentrate on indie and dance music, but it continued to lose listeners. This included 30 hours of 'specialist' music including programmes from The Wise Guys, Eddy Temple Morris and the Trade nightclub. Money was spent on advertising and a high-profile breakfast show was attempted fronted by Marc Brow (including several innovative ideas like travel news backed by new age chill out music called 'Traffic Calming', and specially re-formatted youth news presented by Specialist Producer Mark Ovenden which included one of the first broadcast uses of the term 'The Noughties'), in 1999 the station suffered its lowest Rajar ratings since it first came on the air, with the audience falling to just under 1 million UK listeners in the last quarter of the year.

In November 1999, with the arrival of John O'Hara as the new managing director, the station re-launched in February 2000 as "The New Atlantic 252". The format was changed to urban contemporary music (such as garage, house, hip hop and R&B) and the station was rebranded with the slogan "Non-stop Rhythm and Dance". There was over £1million spent on rebranding and marketing the station to a new audience and media buyers, including a new website. Under the new format RAJAR ratings rose once more above the 1 million mark, the station had a better market value and the sale of the station was announced in early 2001 by its owners RTÉ and CLT.

Last broadcast
The last show on Atlantic was presented by Enda Caldwell on Thursday 20 December 2001. This was followed by a tribute show produced by Enda Caldwell and Eric Murphy celebrating the station's 12-year history of broadcasting and featuring classic airchecks of each year of Atlantic 252's history. The station then transitioned to automation, and continued broadcasting music without continuity, along with pre-booked commercials, until midnight on 2 January 2002, when transmissions ceased.

Notable DJs

Many of the original presenters line-up came from Laser 558/UK Commercial Radio and BBC Radio One and the Irish presenters came from Dublin Superpirates like Sunshine 101 and SuperQ 102. During the early years the presenters that worked at Atlantic 252 utilised funny names, an idea originated in the US at stations like WHTZ FM Z100.

 Bam Bam (real name Peter Poulton, also used Peter Jarrod)
 Robin Banks (Christian Richardson)
 Enda Caldwell
 David Dunne
 Rick O'Shea (Paul Crossan)
 Eddy Temple-Morris
 Charlie Wolf (Steven Linskey)
 Gill the Jock (Gillian Dunne)

Replacements
Atlantic 252 was briefly replaced by a sports station TEAMtalk 252, which opened in the early days of January 2002. This faced competition from BBC Radio 5 Live and talkSPORT, and was itself closed in the summer of 2002, just a few months after its launch. The transmission site is now owned by 2RN (RTÉ Networks) and the 252 kHz frequency is used by RTÉ Radio 1. Digital Radio Mondiale (DRM) tests have also been heard on this frequency since 2007. Mornington House is now regional offices for Meath County Council.

See also
 RTL Group
 TEAMtalk 252

References

External links
 Official tribute site
 Atlantic 252 station page on Radiowaves.FM
 Full recordings of Atlantic 252 from the Radio Retro section at Radiowaves.FM
 Listen to Atlantic 252 as featured on The Anorak Hour from Phantom FM

Defunct RTÉ radio stations
Defunct radio stations in the United Kingdom
Radio stations established in 1989
Radio stations disestablished in 2002